Juan de Landa was a Mexican bobsledder. He competed in the four-man event at the 1928 Winter Olympics.

References

External links
 

Year of birth missing
Year of death missing
Mexican male bobsledders
Olympic bobsledders of Mexico
Bobsledders at the 1928 Winter Olympics
Place of birth missing